Richard is a 1972 film co-directed by Harry Hurwitz and Lorees Yerby.  The film was notable as it was a lampoon of President Richard Nixon before the Watergate scandal.

Plot
In order to earn his wings, a Guardian Angel (Rooney) comes down from heaven to train Richard (Dixon) to be President of the United States. He wins the 1968 presidential election, which was, in reality, sponsored by a group of Irishmen on a bet.

Cast
 Mickey Rooney as Guardian Angel
 Imogene Bliss as Mother
 Marvin Braverman as Hardhat
 John Carradine as Plastic Surgeon
 Richard M. Dixon as Richard
 Paul Ford as Washington Doctor 
 Kevin McCarthy as Washington Doctor
 Vivian Blaine

External links

1972 films
1972 comedy films
Films directed by Harry Hurwitz
Films about Richard Nixon
1970s English-language films
1970s American films